David Wang, better known by his stage name Mochipet, is a Taiwanese American record producer. His recordings have been released on multiple record labels such as Death$ucker, Peace Off, and Violent Turd. He is also the owner of Daly City Records.

Career 
Mochipet released the album, Combat, in 2004. It was followed by Uzumaki.
In 2008, he released Microphonepet, an album consisting of tracks he has recorded with underground rappers for five years. Alan Ranta of Tiny Mix Tapes gave the album a favorable review, describing it as "one of the strongest hip-hop 
albums of 2008". KEXP-FM chose "Sharp Drest", a song off of the album, as their Song of the Day on June 23, 2008.

Discography

Albums 
 Randbient Works 2002 (2002)
 Combat (2004)
 Uzumaki (2004)
 Feel My China (2005)
 Disko Donkey (2006)
 Girls Love Breakcore (2007)
 Feel My China II (2008)
 Microphonepet (2008)
 Microphonepet Remixed (2008)
 Master P on Atari (2009)
 Bunnies & Muffins (2009)
 Master P on Atari: Transformed Volume 2 (2010)
 Hello My Name Is (2011)
 10 Reasons to Love Hate Dubstep (2011)
 Chicxulub (2011)
 Mochipet Is Evil (2012)
 Godzilla Rehab Center (2013)
 Rawr Means I Love You (2013)
 Kaiju Pet (2013)

EPs 
 Electric Saki House (2004)
 Recored (sic) (2009)
 Retweaked (2009)
 Rehyped (2009)
 Rebootied (2009)
 Cowgirls Gets the Pets (2010)

Singles 
 Nelly vs. Venetian Snares (2003)
 My Gucci Chainsaw Ass Clap Attack (2006)
 Godzilla New Year (2009)
 Whomp-A-Saurus Sex (2011)

Remixes 
 Exillon - "Nuclear Dolphin Jungle" from Prequiem (2005)
 Otto von Schirach - "Earjuice Synthesis (Earjuice Daly City Freestyle Hyphee Yay Area Jam)" from Armpit Buffet (2005)
 Kraddy - "Android Porn (Mochipet 'Godzillaporn' Remix)" from Android Porn Remixes (2010)
The Bins - "Inspiration (Mochipet's Wormhole Generator Remix)" from Inspiration (2011)
 Kid 606 - "Ejaculazer Tag (Mochipet Remix)" from Ejaculazer Tag (2012)
 Restiform Bodies - "Bobby Trendy Addendum (Mochipet Remix)" from TV Loves You Back Remixes (2013)

References

External links 
 
 

American electronic musicians
American hip hop record producers
Musicians from California
People from Daly City, California
Living people
BPitch Control artists
1980 births
Record producers from California